This is the list of commanders of the Escola de Comando e Estado-Maior do Exército (ECEME). Since 1905, ECEME has had 57 effective commanders. Among them, the most notable are the President Humberto de Alencar Castello Branco and ministers Nestor Sezefredo dos Passos, Henrique Teixeira Lott, Zenildo Gonzaga Zoroastro de Lucena, Ivan de Sousa Mendes and  Sérgio Westphalen Etchegoyen.

Escola de Estado-Maior (1905-1955)

Escola de Comando e Estado-Maior do Exército (1955-present)

See also
 Brazilian Army
 Escola de Comando e Estado-Maior do Exército
 Academia Militar das Agulhas Negras
 List of Commanders of the Academia Militar das Agulhas Negras
 Preparatory School of the Brazilian Army (Escola Preparatória de Cadetes do Exército)

External links 
 Escola de Comando e Estado-Maior do Exército web page

References

Brazilian Army
Brazilian military personnel